Ichneutica chryserythra is a moth of the family Noctuidae. Living specimens have distinctive violet red coloured forewings but can be distinguished from the similar species Ichneutica marmorata as it lacks the dark edge markings of the later species. I. chryserythra can only be found in the southern parts of the South Island. Adults are on the wing between November to January. The life history of the species and the host species of its larvae are unknown.

Taxonomy
This species was first described by George Hampson from both a male and a female specimen and named Morrisonia chryserythra. The male type specimen was collected in Orepuki by Mr Dunlop and is now held at the Natural History Museum, London. The female specimen is said to be in the Dunlop Collection.

In his 1988 catalogue, J. S. Dugale stated that this species was within the Graphania genus. In 2019 Robert Hoare undertook a major review of New Zealand Noctuidae species. During this review the genus Ichneutica was greatly expanded and the genus Graphania was subsumed into that genus as a synonym. As a result of this review, this species is now known as Ichneutica hartii.

Description 
Hampson described the species as follows:

This moth is distinctive, with a violet red hue to the forewings in living specimens. The male has a wingspan of between 40 and 43 mm and the female of between 48 and 49 mm. This species has darker forms and may be confused with I. marmorata however the later species has forewings that are edged with dark markings. The appearance of this moth tends to fade to tawny as specimens age.

Distribution
It is endemic to New Zealand and can only be found in the southern parts of the South Island.

Habitat 
This species can be found in copper tussock grassland as well as in podocarp forests. It has been collected in open habitats as well as dense forest in the Catlins, often at higher altitudes but can occur at lower altitudes, including down to sea level at its type locality. It appears to be absent from dryer localities.

Behaviour 
Adults of this species are on the wing from November to January.

Life history and host species 
The life history of this species is unknown as are the host species of its larvae. It is possible that the larvae of this species is a monocot feeder and it has been hypothesised that the larvae consume Chionochloa rubra cuprea. However, as the species is also found in podocarp forest the host species of the larvae may include other plant species.

References

Hadeninae
Moths of New Zealand
Moths described in 1905
Endemic fauna of New Zealand
Taxa named by George Hampson
Endemic moths of New Zealand